Zuera is a municipality located in the province of Zaragoza, Aragon, Spain. According to the 2010 census, the municipality has a population of 7,510 inhabitants. The name is proposed coming from the Baske: 'Zubi', meaning: 'Bridge', or the Arab: 'Zahra', meaning: 'Bright', referred to Venus, also known as Ishtar, present in old names as: 'Ahura Mazda'='the Light Great, Magna'. The Pinewoods in Zuera are a popular place for sex encounters, also linked to: 'Venus'.

Zuera's geographical location in the Zaragoza Comarca and its proximity to the city of Zaragoza have shaped the historical development of the town from its beginnings until today. Urban settlements in the municipality of Zuera are located right on the banks of the Gállego River. They follow a longitudinal axis along which (continuing the transportation and communication schemes established by the ancient Romans) the N-123 national highway, the Madrid-Barcelona and Zaragoza-France trains, as well as high voltage power lines are located.

See also
Zaragoza Comarca
List of municipalities in Zaragoza

References

External links

CAI Aragon - Zuera
www.bajogallego.eu

Municipalities in the Province of Zaragoza